Now, Voyager is the debut mini-album by Manchester rock band The Cape Race. It was self-released on 4 July 2011 for free from thecaperace.com/nowvoyager.

Track listing

Title

It was revealed in an interview with vocalist David Moloney that the origin of the title came from the poem ‘The Untold Want’ by Walt Whitman. Moloney said "It’s about people who don’t settle for what they are given and take it upon themselves to better their situation and create the life they want for themselves. I thought it was a good summation of The Cape Race and how it came to be."

Personnel

The Cape Race
 David Moloney - Vocals
 Matt Sayward - Guitar, additional percussion, group vocals
 Scott Perkins - Guitar, additional percussion
 Adam Lewis - Bass, backing vocals
 Jonny Davys - Drums

Producer
 Peter Miles

Engineer
 Daniel Hayes

Additional performances
 Luke Leighfield - Piano, keyboard and organ
 Duncan Howsley - Group vocals on They're Young, They're In Love and Barcelona
 Daniel Hayes - Group vocals on They're Young, They're In Love and Barcelona

Locations

Recorded
 Earth Terminal Studios, Odiham, Hampshire

Mixed
 Earth Terminal Studios, Odiham, Hampshire & Middle Farm Studios, Combe Park, Bickington, Devon.

Mastered
 Middle Farm Studios, Combe Park, Bickington, Devon & The Loft, Kerridge, Cheshire.

Critical Acclaim

Album Of The Year - Music From Rainy Skies 

Rock Sound (7/10) 

All-Gigs (4/5) 

Bring The Noise

Forgetting Anna

References

2011 albums